The 13th Daytime Emmy Awards were held on Thursday, July 17, 1986, on NBC to commemorate excellence in daytime programming from March 6, 1985 to March 5, 1986. The telecast, lasting from 3-4:30 p.m., preempted Santa Barbara.

Winners in each category are in bold.

Outstanding Daytime Drama Series

All My Children
As the World Turns
General Hospital
The Young and the Restless

Outstanding Actor in a Daytime Drama Series

David Canary (Adam Chandler and Stuart Chandler, All My Children)
Scott Bryce (Craig Montgomery, As the World Turns)
Larry Bryggman (John Dixon, As the World Turns)
Robert S. Woods (Bo Buchanan, One Life to Live)
Nicolas Coster (Lionel Lockridge, Santa Barbara)
Terry Lester (Jack Abbott, The Young and the Restless)

Outstanding Actress in a Daytime Drama Series

Susan Lucci (Erica Kane, All My Children)
Elizabeth Hubbard (Lucinda Walsh, As the World Turns)
Peggy McCay (Caroline Brady, Days of Our Lives)
Kim Zimmer (Reva Shayne, Guiding Light)
Erika Slezak (Victoria Lord, One Life to Live)

Outstanding Supporting Actor in a Daytime Drama Series

Louis Edmonds (Langley Wallingford, All My Children)
Gregg Marx (Tom Hughes, As the World Turns)
John Wesley Shipp (Douglas Cummings, As the World Turns)
Larry Gates (H.B. Lewis, Guiding Light)
Al Freeman, Jr. (Ed Hall, One Life to Live)

Outstanding Supporting Actress in a Daytime Drama Series

Eileen Herlie (Myrtle Fargate, All My Children)
Kathleen Widdoes (Emma Snyder, As the World Turns)
Leann Hunley (Anna DiMera, Days of Our Lives)
Uta Hagen (Hortense, One Life to Live)
Dame Judith Anderson (Minx Lockridge, Santa Barbara)

Outstanding Young Man in a Daytime Drama Series

Michael E. Knight (Tad Martin, All My Children)
Don Scardino (Chris Chapin, Another World)
Brian Bloom (Dusty Donovan, As the World Turns)
Jon Hensley (Holden Snyder, As the World Turns)
Vincent Irizarry (Lujack Luvonaczek, Guiding Light)

Outstanding Ingenue in a Daytime Drama Series

Debbi Morgan (Angie Hubbard, All My Children)Ellen Wheeler (Vicky Hudson and Marley Hudson, Another World)
Martha Byrne (Lily Walsh, As the World Turns)
Robin Wright (Kelly Capwell, Santa Barbara)
Jane Krakowski (T.R. Kendall, Search for Tomorrow)

Outstanding Daytime Drama Series Writing

 General Hospital
 As the World Turns
 Guiding Light (John B Kuntz) The Young and the Restless
NOTE: The award was originally given to The Young and the Restless until a tally miscount forced The Young and the Restless to hand over the award to Guiding Light.

Outstanding Daytime Drama Series Directing
 As the World Turns
 Guiding Light
 The Young and the Restless Days of our Lives 
 One Life to Live

Outstanding Game ShowThe $25,000 Pyramid - A Bob-Sande Stewart Production for CBS (Syn. by 20th Century Fox)
Family Feud - A Mark Goodson Production for ABC (Syn. by Viacom)
Jeopardy! - A Merv Griffin Production (Syn. by KingWorld)
The Price Is Right - A Mark Goodson Production for CBS (Syn. by Television Program Source)
Wheel of Fortune - A Merv Griffin Production for NBC (Syn. by KingWorld)

Outstanding Game Show HostDick Clark (The $25,000 Pyramid)
Bob Barker (The Price Is Right)
Pat Sajak (Wheel of Fortune)

Outstanding Animated ProgramJim Henson, Margaret Loesch, Lee Gunther, Bob Richardson, John Gibbs and Jeffrey Scott (Muppet Babies)'Paul Bogrow, Buzz Potamkin, Steve Lumley, Allan Stevens and Chris Cuddington (CBS Storybreak)
Lee Mendelson, Bill Melendez and Charles M. Schulz (The Charlie Brown and Snoopy Show)
Bill Cosby, Lou Scheimer, Marsh Lamore, Steve Gerber and Phil Harnage (Fat Albert and the Cosby Kids)
William Hanna, Joseph Barbera, Gerard Baldwin, Bob Hathcock, Ray Patterson, Patsy Cameron and Tedd Anasti (The Smurfs'')

References 

013
Daytime Emmy